Daniel Francesco Tuparia (born 24 July 1993), better known by his stage name Cesqeaux, is a Dutch producer and DJ.

Cesqeaux has released original tracks, but has been featured in tracks on Dim Mak Records, Mixmash Records, Max Records, Mad Decent, Interscope Records, and more.

He has collaborated with other DJs including; David Guetta, Afrojack, Mike Cervello, Wiwek, LNY TNZ, Mightyfools, Kayzo, San Holo, Curbi and more.

Cesqeaux has performed at music festivals such as Tomorrowland Brazil, Tomorrowland Belgium, and Dance Valley, and has been featured on the biggest talk show in the Netherlands, De Wereld Draait Door (also known as DWDD.)

DJ Laidback Luke stated about Cesqeaux that "He has showmanship, he has passion, he has looks, he has the voice—he's going to be big."

Biography

Early life 
Tuparia was born in Delfzijl, Netherlands. His father was a guitarist, and his mother was a music enthusiast, so he was exposed to music from a very young age. He began playing the drums at age 7. Tuparia has stated that he is of Moluccan descent.

Tuparia attended the Academy for Pop Culture in Holland to study for his bachelor's degree. During this time, he attended a Yellow Claw concert and met with the DJs after the show, where he was asked to send them some of his music.

Music career 
In 2012, Cesqeaux began collaborating with Yellow Claw. Additionally, he performed a supporting act for Diplo in Las Vegas, Nevada. He received airtime on BBC1Xtra and his remix of Putchabackinit by DJ Sliink was featured on 22tracks.

In 2013, Cesqeaux performed in the Dance Valley and Fusion of Dance music festivals.

His remix of The Dopest by Moksi was listed the 8th best trap song of 2015 by runthetrap.

In 2016, Major Lazer released its official Peace is the Mission Remixes album, featuring a remix by Cesqeaux of Night Riders (featuring Travi$ Scott, Pusha T, 2 Chainz and Mad Cobra.) His music was also featured in sets at the Ultra Music Festival in Miami. Additionally, he performed at Tomorrowland Brazil, Tomorrowland Belgium, Mysteryland and Parookaville music festivals.

In June 2017 he co-produced "2U" in collaboration with David Guetta, Giorgio Tuinfort and Justin Bieber.

Discography

Extended plays

Singles

As accompanying artist

As featured artist

Remixes 
2014
 Gianni Marino and Jurab – Wayaki (Cesqeaux Remix)
 Trey Songz – Na Na (Cesqeaux Remix)

2015
 Mike Cervello and Stoltenhoff – Guerilla (Cesqeaux Remix)
 Moksi – The Dopest (Cesqeaux Remix)
 Gregor Salto and Wiwek – On Your Mark (Cesqeaux Remix)
 Selena Gomez and A$AP Rocky – Good for You (Yellow Claw and Cesqeaux Remix)

2016
 San Holo – Still Looking (Cesqeaux Remix)
 Trolley Snatcha and Modestep – Sing (Yellow Claw and Cesqeaux Remix)
 DJ Snake and Yellow Claw – Ocho Cinco (Cesqeaux Remix)
 Major Lazer – Night Riders (Cesqeaux Remix)
 Yellow Claw – Higher (Cesqeaux Remix)
 Laidback Luke, GTA and Aruna – The Chase (Mike Cervello and Cesqeaux Remix)

2018
 Martin Garrix featuring Khalid – "Ocean" (Martin Garrix and Cesqeaux Remix)

2020
 David Guetta and Sia - Let's Love (Cesqeaux Remix)

References 

Dutch DJs
Dutch musicians
Living people
Dutch people of Moluccan descent
Indo people
People from Delfzijl
Mad Decent artists
Stmpd Rcrds artists
Dim Mak Records artists
1993 births